Hidalgo del Parral is a city and seat of the municipality of Hidalgo del Parral in the Mexican state of Chihuahua. It is located in the southern part of the state,  from the state capital, the city of Chihuahua, Chihuahua. As of 2015, the city of Hidalgo del Parral had a population of 109,510 inhabitants, while the metro area had a population of 129,688 inhabitants. The city was founded as San José del Parral. The name was changed after independence from Spain, in honour of Fr Miguel Hidalgo, widely considered the 'Father of the Country'.

History
According to legend, Juan Rangel de Biezma came here in 1629, picked up a rock on the “Cerro la Prieta” (La Prieta Hill), licked it and proclaimed “There is a mineral deposit here.” This deposit produced silver for 340 years.

Parral was once a bustling center for silver mining. As early as 1567, the silver mines at Santa Barbara were established in the territory of the Conchos people. However, in 1631, a vast new silver strike was made in what is now southern Chihuahua. Later, in 1640, it was declared "Capital of the World of Silver" by monarch Philip IV of Spain, at the very height of the Spanish Empire, that included territories in Eastern Asia, Italy, and the Low Countries .

The large area of southern Chihuahua inhabited by the Tarahumara people included the highway between the mining districts of Parral, Cusihuiriachic, and Chihuahua. Asarco managed the La Prieta mine until the boom ended in the early 1930s; the minerals that were extracted were sent to the United States for final processing and then shipped back to Mexico, the US and other markets. After the end of the silver mining boom, Parral was almost completely abandoned in the early 1930s (although the surrounding district continues to be mined for silver and base metals.)

Currently, Parral is a medium-sized town in the state of Chihuahua mainly dedicated to commerce, and is an important regional center for trade between the southern regions of Chihuahua and northern Durango. It received its first local television station in 1969, the now-defunct XHJMA-TV channel 3, and it currently has one local station, XHMH-TV channel 13.

Urban development has been slow due to the lack of potable water and its complex physical geography. Its intricate network of streets and alleys are distinctive features of the city, helping to preserve its colonial style.

Parral is often associated with several historical figures, including Mexican revolutionary leader Pancho Villa, who was assassinated in Parral on July 20, 1923, and initially buried here; and border ruffian "Dirty" Dave Rudabaugh, a sometime friend and foe of Billy the Kid.

Notable sites

El Palacio de Alvarado
It belonged to one of the most prominent families in Parral, descendants of Pedro Alvarado owning the silver mine called “La Palmilla.” This family was rich enough to offer the President Porfirio Díaz to pay the national external debt. The palace was constructed by Federico Amérigo Rouvier and it is now a museum and cultural center. It has preserved much of the original European-made furniture. The walls of the patio were painted by Italian painter Antonio Decanini between 1946 and 1948.

El Hotel Hidalgo
This historical building was a gift from Don Pedro Alvarado to Pancho Villa and is located next to the Plaza Guillermo Baca.

La Casa de la Familia Griensen (the Griensen Family House)
This is where Elisa Griensen was born. She distinguished herself in Parral history by fighting against a contingent of U.S. soldiers sent to capture Pancho Villa after he crossed the border and attacked Columbus, New Mexico.

The Francisco Villa Museum
The Francisco Villa Museum is a historical building located on the street near the spot where Villa's enemies waited days for him to pass and ultimately assassinated him in 1923. Every year in July, his death is reenacted here.

Casa Stallforth
This was a beautiful and luxurious palace (during the era), with a beautiful baroque style; decorated in the facade with many beings from the Nordic mythology, that once belonged to the Stallforth family—who along with the Alvarado family, became the town's main benefactors, contributing much to its infrastructure.

Notable events
The annual staging of the Murder of Francisco Villa, a recreation using props from the era, in the exact place of the historical event.

The annual Cabalgata Villista, is a long-distance horse ride with statewide massive participation and a spectacular visual event as thousands of horses enter the city (see Cavalcade).

Food
In addition to its diverse and rich History, Parral is famous for its traditional foods. Parral was recently named as one of the “Ten Gastronomic Marvels of Mexico,” primarily for its artisan confectioneries dulces de leche. These include a wide variety of candies and pastries from old recipes based on milk, sugar, and natural fruits. Some other notable recipes with a touch of Parral are enchiladas, rayadas, barbacoa, steaks and cabrito (goat).

Dulces de leche
Dulces de leche are cooked-milk confections found nationwide in Mexico; Parral has been historically acclaimed since the 1930s because of the distinctive flavor of its dulces de leche—candies made with nuts like pecans, peanuts, hazelnuts, and fruits such as apricot, pineapple, coconut and others. Parral's candies have been shipped around the world; interesting destinations include Vatican City, Washington DC, and London.

These traditional confections arrived in Parral in the early 20th century. The origin of recipes is unknown, although it is believed that they arrived in southern Mexico from Europe during the colonial times. Then, these recipes were transferred to later generations.

One of the most famous confectionery artisans in Parral was Don Pablo Rodríguez, founder of La Gota de Miel. Don Pablito (as the Parralenses knew him) was born in Teocaltiche, Jalisco in the late 19th century. He and his wife arrived in Parral in the early 20th century, after working for several years in the State of Coahuila as a baker and a cook in the Hacienda del Rosario (now Parras de la Fuente) for Francisco Madero and Mercedes González (parents of President Francisco I. Madero). It is believed that their recipes might have acquired some influence from professional chefs also working in the hacienda at the time.

Several local artisans in Parral had recently—in the late 1990s—attempted to imitate Don Pablito's original recipe without success.

Enchiladas
Enchiladas are a specialty Mexican plate also found nationwide, and Parral is traditionally famous for its delicious enchiladas. They are a rolled maize tortilla stuffed with meat and covered with a tomato and chile sauce. Enchiladas can be filled with a variety of ingredients, including meat, cheese, beans, potatoes, vegetables, or seafood.

These other traditions in Parral started in the early 20th century and they gained notoriety in the mid-late 20th century. Enchiladas originated in Mexico. Anthropological evidence suggests that the indigenous people of the Valley of Mexico traditionally ate corn tortillas folded or rolled around small fish. Writing at the time of the Spanish conquistadors, Bernal Díaz del Castillo documented a feast enjoyed by Europeans hosted by Hernán Cortés in Coyoacán. In the 19th century, as Mexican cuisine was being memorialized, enchiladas were mentioned in the first Mexican cookbook, El cocinero mexicano (The Mexican Chef), published in 1831, and in Mariano Galván Rivera's Diccionario de Cocina, published in 1845.[4][8] Probably, as with the dulces de leche, these recipes arrived to Parral from immigrants from the south of Mexico.

Among the most famous cookers of enchiladas in Parral was Doña Cuca, near the historical Calicanto bridge.

Barbacoa
Barbacoa is meat from cattle or sheep slowly cooked over an open fire or, more traditionally, in a hole dug in the ground covered with maguey leaves; although the interpretation is loose, in the present day it may refers to meat steamed until tender.

During colonial and post-colonial times, Parral was famous because of its delectable barbacoa or birria de hoyo. Such barbacoa contained ingredients as laurel (bay leaf), garlic, maguey, onions, and other condiments. It was one of the luscious foods of the executives, foreigners, and miners working in the silver mines at Parral.

Sports
Judo
Parral has one of the best clubs of Judo throughout Latin America: Judokan Parral. It is a Judo academy in one of the most isolated places in Mexico, and Gabriel González. Among the most recognized alumni of Judokan is Vanessa Zambotti. She is an Olympic judo-fighter with international experience. She started practicing the sport at Judokan Parral (for her complete history see).

Judokan is increasingly becoming one of the most important cultures for future generations who follow the sport closely in the North of Mexico. Right now, some historians are working on achieving oral testimonies and photographs to sketch part of northern Mexico popular history, and they will include the impact of judo among practitioners.
 
Baseball
Parral is famous, primarily in the North of Mexico, for its baseball team Los Mineros de Parral.

Government
As of January 2020, the city's mayor is Jorge Alfredo Lozoya Santillán, while the current city clerk is Francisco Adrián Sánchez Villegas.

Notable people from Parral
 Gloria and Nellie Campobello, ballet dancers and choreographers. Born in Ocampo, Durango, spent their childhood in Parral.
 Consuelo Duval, actress.
 Fernanda Familiar, journalist.
 Manuel Gómez Morín, politician, founding member of the National Action Party, born in Batopilas, Chihuahua, then moved to Parral.
 Juan Gómez-Quiñones, historian, professor of history, poet, and activist. Co-editor of the Plan de Santa Bárbara.
 Linda Helú Atta, Carlos Slim's mother.
 Humberto Mariles, show jumping champion in the 1948 Summer Olympics in London, where he won gold medals both in Individual Jumping and in Team Jumping.
 Carlos Montemayor, novelist, poet, essayist and literary critic.
 Adrián Mora, professional footballer, currently playing for Toluca.
 Antonio Ortiz Mena, politician and economist. Director of the Mexican Social Security Institute from 1952 to 1958, Secretary of Finance and Public Credit from 1958 to 1970, president of the Inter-American Development Bank from 1971 to 1988.
 José Fernando Ramírez, historian.
 Yair Rodríguez, mixed martial artist, current Interim UFC Featherweight Champion.
 Misael Rodríguez, bronze medal, boxing men's middleweight at the 2016 Summer Olympics 
 Rafael Rangel Sostmann, rector of the Instituto Tecnologico y de Estudios Superiores de Monterrey.
 Aurora Reyes Flores, painter, first female exponent of Mexican muralism.
 Alfredo Ripstein, film producer.
 Jesús Gabriel Sandoval Chávez, professional boxer.
 Vanessa Zambotti, judoka, Gold medalist in the Pan American Games, Rio de Janeiro 2007.
Alex Dey, motivational speaker.

Climate
Parral has an altitude-moderated semi-arid climate (Köppen BSk) with rainfall limited to heavy thunderstorms during the hot summer months. During the dry season from October to May, days range from mild to hot and nights from chilly to mild. Frosts are common though not persistent in the winter.

Sister cities

  Santa Fe, New Mexico, United States
  West Kanpur, India

References

 Link to tables of population data from Census of 2005 INEGI: Instituto Nacional de Estadística, Geografía e Informática

External links
 Municipio de Hidalgo del Parral Official website
 Parral Chihuahua
 www.PuroChihuahua.com
 www.houstonculture.org
 www.enparral.com
  Parral images

 
 Map with the points of interest in the city of Parral https://www.youtube.com/watch?v=uE26jkv3b2c

Populated places in Chihuahua (state)
Populated places established in 1631
1631 establishments in New Spain